The Sandown Depot is a former railroad station of the Boston and Maine Railroad in Sandown, New Hampshire. Built in 1873–74, it is the best-preserved of stations built by the Nashua and Rochester Railroad to survive, remaining relatively unaltered since its construction, and still at its original location. It is now a local history museum, and was listed on the National Register of Historic Places in 1986, and the New Hampshire State Register of Historic Places in 2011.

Description and history
The former Sandown Depot is located on the north side of the village center of Sandown, just off Main Street between Depot Road and the former railroad right-of-way now occupied by the Rockingham Recreational Trail. Its exterior is finished in wooden clapboards, and it is covered by a broad low-pitch hip roof, whose eaves extend well beyond the structure and are supported by large knee brackets. The track side of the building has a projecting window bay near the center, next to which a semaphore mast rises through the roof. The interior is divided into sections historically used as passenger waiting areas (one each for men and women), freight storage, and the station master's office and telegraph dispatch. Portions of the interior have been modernized.

This station was built in 1873–74 by the Nashua and Rochester Railroad, which was eventually absorbed by the Boston and Maine Railroad. The station was a major location on a heavily traveled single track, with support services including a telegraph office, post office, freight depot, and a large siding area with capacity for 62 cars. It consequently became a major point of civic activity in the rural town. Rail traffic declined in the early 1930s, and the rails were taken up in 1935. The depot building was used by the state highway department as a storage facility between 1934 and 1977, and has since been converted to a local history museum.

See also
National Register of Historic Places listings in Rockingham County, New Hampshire

References

External links
 Sandown Historical Society - Facebook site
 Sandown NH Depot Website - web site

Stations along Boston and Maine Railroad lines
Former railway stations in New Hampshire
Railway stations on the National Register of Historic Places in New Hampshire
Railway stations in the United States opened in 1873
Railroad museums in New Hampshire
Transportation buildings and structures in Rockingham County, New Hampshire
Repurposed railway stations in the United States
Museums in Rockingham County, New Hampshire
History museums in New Hampshire
National Register of Historic Places in Rockingham County, New Hampshire
New Hampshire State Register of Historic Places
Sandown, New Hampshire